Maimoola or Memola is an area serving as the headquarters of Barang Tehsil, Bajaur Agency, Federally Administered Tribal Areas, Pakistan. As of 2017, the population is 530.

References

Populated places in Bajaur District